Lake Van Arsdale, also known as Van Arsdale Reservoir, is a reservoir on the Eel River in California, part of the Potter Valley Project.

The reservoir is formed by the Cape Horn Dam, also known as Van Arsdale Dam, which impounds the waters of the Eel River.  A portion of its water ( per year, on average) is diverted southward through an aqueduct tunnel to a powerhouse in Potter Valley, where it drives a turbine capable of generating up to 9.4 MW of electric power.  Diverted water then descends by means of the Powerhouse Canal and East Fork Russian River to Lake Mendocino, which supplies the Sonoma County Water Agency.  The non-diverted flow continues down the Eel to its mouth at the Pacific Ocean near Fortuna.

History 
In 1905, the Snow Mountain Water and Power Company started building the Potter Valley Project.  Cape Horn Dam was completed in 1907, and the original project became operational in 1908. Pacific Gas and Electric Company took over the  project in 1930 and has owned the dam ever since.

Cape Horn Dam 

See also 
 Lake Pillsbury
 List of reservoirs and dams in California
 List of lakes in California

References

External links

SCWA reservoir levels, including Lake Van Arsdale

Buildings and structures completed in 1907
Van Arsdale
Dams in California
Pacific Gas and Electric Company dams
Eel River (California)
Historic American Engineering Record in California